Robert Lewis Coffey Jr. (October 21, 1918 – April 20, 1949) was an American coal miner, World War II veteran, and politician who served briefly as a Democratic member of the U.S. House of Representatives from Pennsylvania. A former military fighter pilot, Coffey was killed after only four months in Congress when a military aircraft he was co-piloting crashed in an experimental flight.

Early life and career
Robert Coffey was born in Chattanooga, Tennessee, and moved with his parents in early boyhood to Pennsylvania.  He attended the University of Pittsburgh and Pennsylvania State University.

He was employed in coal mines in all positions from coal loader to engineer.

World War II and military career
During World War II, he served in the United States Army Air Forces.  He flew as a member of the 365th Fighter Group, called the "Hell Hawks," piloting the P-47 Thunderbolt. He commanded the group's 388th Fighter Squadron and was later deputy commander of the group. He was the group's top air ace with credit for six aerial victories during 97 missions. He was shot down and evaded capture.

He was the military air attaché for the United States Embassy in Santiago, Chile, from October 1945 to April 1948.  He resigned his commission as a lieutenant colonel to pursue a political candidacy.  He was commissioned a colonel in the United States Air Force Reserve.  During his military service, he was awarded the Distinguished Flying Cross, Air Medal, Purple Heart, Bronze Star, Presidential Citation, and Belgian and French Croix de Guerre.

Congress
He was elected as a Democrat to the 81st Congress in 1948, defeating incumbent Republican Congressman Harve Tibbott, and served from January 3, 1949, until his death in an airplane accident at Kirtland Air Force Base near Albuquerque, New Mexico.

Personal life
Coffey was married to Eileen Mercado Parra, with whom he had three children:  Robert Lewis, Eileen María and David Mario.

Death
On April 20, 1949, Coffey was killed in the crash of Lockheed F-80A-10-LO Shooting Star, 44-85438, c/n  080-1461, while on take-off from Kirtland AFB, New Mexico, at 1640 hrs. during a cross-country proficiency flight. He and fellow Hell Hawks pilot Lt. Col. William D. Ritchie had departed Kirtland after refuelling for March AFB, California, but due to apparent engine failure on take-off, the fighter never rose above 25 feet, skidded off end of runway, cartwheeled across an arroyo, and broke apart but did not burn. Coffey was killed instantly. He is buried in Arlington National Cemetery. The House of Representatives recessed for one day in his honor.

See also
 List of United States Congress members who died in office (1900–49)

References

1918 births
1949 deaths
Burials at Arlington National Cemetery
Politicians from Chattanooga, Tennessee
Recipients of the Air Medal
Recipients of the Distinguished Flying Cross (United States)
United States Air Force officers
Aviators killed in aviation accidents or incidents in the United States
Accidental deaths in New Mexico
United States Army Air Forces pilots of World War II
United States Army Air Forces officers
Military personnel from Pennsylvania
Democratic Party members of the United States House of Representatives from Pennsylvania
20th-century American politicians
United States air attachés
Victims of aviation accidents or incidents in 1949
American World War II flying aces